Lorena Patricia González Silva (born 24 April 1989) is a Uruguayan professional footballer who plays as a centre-back for the Uruguay women's national team.

International career
González capped for Uruguay during the 2014 Copa América Femenina.

References

External links

1989 births
Living people
People from Melo, Uruguay
Uruguayan women's footballers
Women's association football central defenders
Colón F.C. players
Campeonato Brasileiro de Futebol Feminino Série A1 players
Uruguay women's international footballers
Uruguayan expatriate women's footballers
Uruguayan expatriate sportspeople in Brazil
Expatriate women's footballers in Brazil
Grêmio Foot-Ball Porto Alegrense (women) players